The Hobart Statesmen are composed of 11 teams representing Hobart and William Smith Colleges in intercollegiate athletics, including men's basketball, cross country, football, golf, ice hockey, lacrosse, rowing, sailing, soccer, squash, and tennis. The Statesmen compete in the NCAA Division III and are members of the Liberty League for all sports except men's volleyball that they will join the United Volleyball Conference in 2023–24, in the inaugural season of the team and men's lacrosse, which competes in NCAA Division I, as a member of the Atlantic 10 Conference.

History
Originally known as the Hobart Deacons, Hobart's athletic teams became known as the "Statesmen" in 1936, following the football team's season opener against Amherst College. The morning after the game, The New York Times referred to the team as "the statesmen from Geneva", and the name stuck.

Football
Offensive linesman Ali Marpet, drafted in the second round, 61st overall, of the 2015 NFL draft, is the highest-drafted pick in the history of Division III football. He was three-time All-Liberty League first team (2012, 2013, 2014), and 2014 Liberty League Co-Offensive Player of the Year—the first offensive lineman in league history to be so honored.

Lacrosse

Hobart lacrosse was started in 1898, playing their first game against rival Cornell. Hobart won 2–1. Hobart became one of the 12 charter members of the U.S. Intercollegiate Lacrosse League in 1906.

The Statesmen lacrosse team has compiled 16 national championships in three different classifications: USILA College Division (1), NCAA Division II/III Combined (2), and NCAA Division III (13). The Statesmen won the first 12 NCAA Division III championships, from 1980 to 1991.

In 1995, Hobart promoted its team from Division III to Division I to preserve the lacrosse rivalry with Cornell and Syracuse. In 2008, the continuation of the series was put in jeopardy when the Hobart Board of Trustees decided to reclassify its lacrosse program back to the Division III level on April 26. After an emotional reaction from the alumni community, however, the decision was reversed on May 1. The following day, Cornell played the first night game at Hobart's Boswell Field.

Ice hockey
The Statesmen ice hockey team is led by Mark Taylor. Since the 2000–2001 season, Coach Taylor has led the Statesmen to a 316–163–50 record and a .635 win percentage (as of 3/6/2016), and five 20-plus-win seasons.

Crew
The Hobart crew team has earned gold medals at the Head of The Charles Regatta, the ECAC National Invitational Regatta (most recently a gold in the 2nd varsity 8+ over the "Hometown Boys" of WPI in 2015), the NIRC Regatta (Most recently in 2019), and the IRA National Championships. While the Hobart crew team has won gold in every event they have entered since the inception of rowing as a Liberty League Sport, they failed to win the team championships only once (2004). The eventual champions, Rensselaer Polytechnic Institute, were known for having a large team and only able to defeat the Statesmen by securing a win in the 2nd Varsity 8+ – the only event that Hobart did not have an entry. However, over the past few seasons Hobart has fielded one of the most dominant 2nd Varsity 8's in school history. The crew team took part in the Henley Royal Regatta in Henley, England, in summer 2011, as well as summer 2015. And The Team Started A Rivalry With the Michigan Wolverines

Rivalries 
Hobart's archrival in football is Union College in Schenectady, New York. Other team rivalries include Clarkson University (Cross Country); Rensselaer (football, basketball); Rochester (football); Elmira, Utica and Manhattanville (hockey); Cornell (one of the oldest in lacrosse) and Syracuse (lacrosse); and Michigan (crew).

References

External links
 

 
Hobart and William Smith Colleges
New England Hockey Conference teams